Niranjana Nagarajan (born 9 October 1988 in Madras, Tamil Nadu) is an Indian cricketer. She represented India in 2 WTests, 22 WODIs and 14 WT20I. She is a right hand batsman and bowls right-arm medium-fast.

Career 
She made her debut in international cricket on 30 August 2008 during India's tour of England in a WODI against England at North Parade, Bath. She also played for Tamil Nadu,  Railways, South Zone and Central Zone in domestic cricket.

She displayed her bowling talent on the English ground when Indian Women played England in their five-match Test series in 2014. The England team were bowled out for just 92 due her outstanding performance (4/19).

As of 2017, she had played two Tests, 22 ODIs and 14 T20Is for India.

References

External links
Niranjana’s ticket to cricketing glory

Living people
1988 births
Cricketers from Chennai
India women One Day International cricketers
India women Twenty20 International cricketers
India women Test cricketers
Tamil Nadu women cricketers
Railways women cricketers
South Zone women cricketers
Central Zone women cricketers